William Stewart Cornyn (1906–1971) was a Canadian-born American linguist and author, noted for his expertise in Burmese and Russian language studies, as well as for his research on Athabaskan and Burman etymology.

Life

Cornyn was born in Vancouver, British Columbia. In 1922, he moved to Los Angeles where he first found work as a stock clerk, hall boy, and bookkeeper. He lived in San Francisco from 1924 to 1928, working as an insurance clerk, eventually returning to Los Angeles.

He graduated from University of California, Los Angeles (BA with highest honors, 1940), and did graduate work at Yale (AM 1942, PhD 1944), where he served as a professor of Slavic and South East Asian Linguistics and chair of both the Department of Slavic Languages and Literatures, and the Russian Area Program.
Cornyn's research focused on the description of and preparation of pedagogical materials for Burmese and Russian. William Cornyn became a member of the Linguistic Society of America in 1941 while working as an Assistant in Germanic Languages at UCLA. In 1962, he was awarded a Guggenheim Fellowship in Linguistics.

He died at the age of sixty-four.

Publications

On Russian

On Burmese

Other publications

Notes

References

1906 births
1971 deaths
20th-century linguists
American orientalists
Burmese studies scholars
Canadian emigrants to the United States
Linguists from the United States
Linguists of Southeast Asian languages
People from Vancouver
Russian language
Russian studies scholars
University of California, Los Angeles alumni
Yale University alumni
Yale University faculty